Plestiodon oshimensis, the Ousima skink, is a species of lizard which is endemic to Japan.

References

oshimensis
Reptiles of Japan
Reptiles described in 1912
Taxa named by Joseph Cheesman Thompson